The Isthmian script is a very early Mesoamerican writing system in use in the area of the Isthmus of Tehuantepec from perhaps 500 BCE to 500 CE, although there is disagreement on these dates. It is also called the La Mojarra script and the Epi-Olmec script ('post-Olmec script').

Isthmian script is structurally similar to the Maya script, and like Maya uses one set of characters to represent logograms (or word units) and a second set to represent syllables.

Recovered texts
The four most extensive Isthmian texts are those found on:

 The La Mojarra Stela 1 
 The Tuxtla Statuette
 Tres Zapotes Stela C
 A Teotihuacan-style mask

Other texts include:

 A few Isthmian glyphs on four badly weathered stelae — 5, 6, 8, and probably 15 — at Cerro de las Mesas.
 Approximately 23 glyphs on the O'Boyle "mask", a clay artifact of unknown provenance.
 A small number of glyphs on a pottery-sherd from Chiapa de Corzo.  This sherd has been assigned the oldest date of any Isthmian script artifact: 450-300 BCE.

Decipherment
In a 1993 paper, John Justeson and Terrence Kaufman proposed a partial decipherment of the Isthmian text found on the La Mojarra Stela, claiming that the language represented was a member of the Zoquean language family.  In 1997, the same two epigraphers published a second paper on Epi-Olmec writing, in which they further claimed that a newly discovered text-section from the stela had yielded readily to the decipherment-system that they had established earlier for the longer section of text.  This led to a Guggenheim Fellowship for their work, in 2003.

The following year, however, their interpretation of the La Mojarra text was disputed by Stephen D. Houston and Michael D. Coe, who had tried unsuccessfully to apply the Justeson-Kaufman decipherment-system to the Isthmian text on the back of the hitherto unknown Teotihuacan-style mask (which is of unknown provenance and is now in a private collection).

Along with proposing an alternative linguistic attribution of Epi-Olmec writing as proto-Huastecan, Vonk (2020) argued that the size of the corpus compares unfavorably in comparison with the rate of repetition within the corpus, so that a unique decipherment is simply impossible given the current state of affairs. He goes on in illustrating the principal applicability of readings in random Old and New world languages (including Ancient Greek, Latin, Spanish and German) to demonstrate the coincidental nature of any such proposals.

The matter is still under discussion. In Lost Languages (2008) Andrew Robinson summarises the position as follows:

Notes

See also
 Cascajal block
 San Andrés (Mesoamerican site)
 Epi-Olmec
Olmec hieroglyphs

References
Brigham Young University press-release on behalf of Brigham Young University archaeologist Stephen Houston and Yale University professor emeritus Michael Coe disputing the Justeson-Kaufman findings.
Diehl, Richard A. (2004) The Olmecs: America's First Civilization, Thames & Hudson, London.
Houston, Stephen, and Michael Coe (2004) "Has Isthmian Writing Been Deciphered?", Mexicon XXV: 151-161.
Justeson, John S., and Terrence Kaufman (1993), "A Decipherment of Epi-Olmec Hieroglyphic Writing" in Science, Vol. 259, 19 March 1993, pp. 1703–11.
Justeson, John S., and Terrence Kaufman (1997) "A Newly Discovered Column in the Hieroglyphic Text on La Mojarra Stela 1: a Test of the Epi-Olmec Decipherment", Science, Vol. 277, 11 July 1997, pp. 207–10.
Justeson, John S., and Terrence Kaufman (2001) Epi-Olmec Hieroglyphic Writing and Texts .
Lo, Lawrence; "Epi-Olmec", at Ancient Scripts.com (accessed January 2008).
Pérez de Lara, Jorge, and John Justeson "Photographic Documentation of Monuments with Epi-Olmec Script/Imagery", Foundation for the Advancement of Mesoamerican Studies (FAMSI).
Robinson, Andrew (2008) Lost Languages: The Enigma of the World's Undeciphered Scripts, Thames & Hudson, .
Schuster, Angela M. H. (1997) "Epi-Olmec Decipherment" in Archaeology, online (accessed January 2008).

External links
 "Photographic Documentation of Monuments with Epi-Olmec Script/Imagery" from the Foundation for the Advancement of Mesoamerican Studies, Inc.
High resolution image of the Isthmian glyph table
Tuxtla Statuette photograph
Drawing of La Mojarra Stela 1
High resolution photo of the Coe/Houston Mask

Epi-Olmec culture
Mesoamerican writing systems
Undeciphered writing systems
Writing systems introduced in the 1st millennium BC